is a village located in Shimajiri District, Okinawa Prefecture, Japan. The village consists of Tonaki Island and the uninhabited Irisuna Island.

As of 2013, the village has an estimated population of 334 and a density of 89 persons per km². The highest point in Tonaki is on Tonaki Island at 

The village is accessible by regular ferry service from Tomari Port in Naha.

Tonaki was once an active center of bonito fishing, but now the village economy is evenly divided between agriculture and fishing. Tonaki is in a long-term state of population decline.

See also
 Tonaki Prefectural Natural Park
Groups of Traditional Buildings

References

External links

Tonaki-son official website 
Tonaki-son Elementary and Junior High School 

Villages in Okinawa Prefecture